"Where I Belong" is a song by Christian band Building 429 from their 2011 album Listen to the Sound. Written by Jason Roy and Jason Ingram, it was released on Essential Records. It was named 2013 Billboard Magazine Christian Song of the Year after topping the US Billboard Christian Songs chart. It was certified gold by the Recording Industry Association of America (RIAA). "Where I Belong" was also appears on WOW Hits 2013.

Meaning
Roy said about the song: "'Where I Belong' is one song the whole thought process of the record was built on, basically saying that nothing on earth can ever satisfy us or make us feel whole because it's not our home... We're made for His glory and His glory alone and it's basically my 'bring it on song' [against earthly temptation] that feels like a rocket going to the moon."

Chart performance
The song topped the US Billboard Christian Songs chart for 15 consecutive weeks, the longest-running No. 1 single of 2013.

"Where I Belong" was ranked as the 2013 Billboard Magazine Christian Song of the Year, despite a big showing by Matt Redman and his song "10,000 Reasons (Bless the Lord)" that had three separate stints at No. 1 for a total of 13 weeks that year. The song spent 63 weeks in total in the Christian Songs chart.

Charts

Weekly charts

Year-end charts

Decade-end charts

Certifications

References

2012 singles
Building 429 songs
2011 songs
Essential Records (Christian) singles